Luis Mario Ibaseta Cobo (31 December 1913 – 28 November 1987) was a Chilean basketball player. He competed in the 1936 Summer Olympics.

References

1913 births
1987 deaths
Chilean men's basketball players
Olympic basketball players of Chile
Basketball players at the 1936 Summer Olympics
Sportspeople from Valparaíso